Bryan Station High School, founded in 1958, is a high school within the Fayette County Public Schools system in Lexington, Kentucky, United States. During the 2006–2007 school year, students were moved to their newly built school known as Bryan Station High.  The school was named for Bryan Station, an 18th-century pioneer settlement.  The school's sports teams are called the Defenders, and the school mascot is the "Mean Man"; the school says "His persona reflects the heritage of the pioneers at the siege of Bryan Station Fort between the British and Indians in 1782."

Athletics
The Defenders support 15 different sports teams including football, basketball, soccer, baseball, wrestling, softball, volleyball, tennis, lacrosse, swimming and track and field. The Defenders' football team won the 1971 2A title. The Defenders' boys track team took home titles in 1971, 1975, and 1979–83. Athletic teams typically play against other teams from Fayette County, including Henry Clay High School, Lafayette High School, Paul Laurence Dunbar High School, and Tates Creek High School.

Notable alumni
Scotty Baesler – Politician; former mayor of Lexington and congressman.
Cornell Burbage – NFL player
Dermontti Dawson – NFL player
Doug Flynn – former Major League Baseball infielder
Jack Givens – NBA player
Teresa Isaac – Politician; former mayor of Lexington.
Tony Jackson – NBA player
Devon Key - NFL player
Frank LeMaster – NFL player
Shelvin Mack – NBA player
Eric Shelton – NFL player
Mohamed Thiaw — MLS player
Melvin Turpin – NBA player

References

Schools in Lexington, Kentucky
Public high schools in Kentucky
1958 establishments in Kentucky
Educational institutions established in 1958